Sanusi bin Junid (11 July 1942 – 9 March 2018) was a Malaysian politician. He was appointed Minister of National and Rural Development in 1981 at the age of 38 and as Minister of Agriculture in 1986. Tan Sri Sanusi was seventh Menteri Besar of Kedah from 1996 to 1999.

Early life
Born in Yan, Kedah on July 11, 1942, Sanusi received his education at the Malay College Kuala Kangsar (MCKK). In 1969, he went on to study at the Institute of Bankers London, the City of London College and the Institute of Export London, and later obtained a Certificate in Foreign Trade and Foreign Exchange at the University of London.

Career
Sanusi began his career as a trainee at Standard Chartered Bank, at Seremban in 1963. In 1971, he was appointed Senior Manager of Chartered Bank Lending, Kuala Lumpur.

Tan Sri Sanusi became the Director of Bank Simpanan Nasional and Chairman of Insan Diranto Bhd. in 1975. Two years later, in 1977, he was appointed as Chairman of Tugu Insurance Sdn. Bhd. and Chairman of Obanto Management Consultancy Sdn. Bhd. In addition he is also the founder of the Shamelin Corporation.

In 1978, Tan Sri Sanusi was appointed as a Member of the MARA University of Technology and subsequently in 1982, he became the Advisor of the College and Council of the University of Malaya. He was also appointed as Chairman of the National Day Committee and Member of the Malaysian Chamber of Commerce in 1983, and in February 2000, he became President of the International Islamic University of Malaysia (IIUM).

Tan Sri Sanusi has also served as Vice President of ABIM and President of the Association of Youth Clubs of Malaysia (MAYC).

Political career
Sanusi was involved in politics as a Seremban UMNO member when he started working in 1963. His rise in politics is fast and smooth.

A year after joining UMNO, Sanusi was appointed as UMNO Youth Secretary of the Seremban Branch and later in 1966, he was appointed as UMNO Treasurer of the Eastern Seremban Division. Sanusi became the Head of UMNO Division of the Eastern Seremban Division and the UMNO Secretary of the Eastern Seremban Division in 1967.

In 1974 at the age of 32, Sanusi took part in the election and was elected as MP of Jerai. He was appointed as Deputy Head of the Umno Division of the Wilderness Division in 1975 and the Head of Information of the UMNO Kedah in 1978.

The leadership talent he displayed made him trustworthy and was appointed to a number of key positions in the cabinet. From 1978 to 1980, he was appointed as Deputy Minister of Land and Regional Development and subsequently Deputy Minister of Home Affairs from 1980 to 1981.

In 1981, Sanusi was appointed as Minister of National and Rural Development and held the office until 1986. In that year, he was also appointed as Chairman of the UMNO Information Committee of Malaysia, Chairman of the UMNO Information Bureau of Malaysia and Member of the Supreme Council of UMNO Malaysia.

In the 1982 election, Sanusi was elected as MP of Jerlun-Langkawi and was later elected to the UMNO Supreme Council of Malaysia. Subsequently, he was appointed as UMNO Malaysia Secretary-General in 1984.

In 1986, Tan Sri Sanusi became Minister of Agriculture and Head of Jerlun Division, Langkawi. He was elected as UMNO Malaysia Vice President in 1990. Sanusi became the seventh Menteri Besar of Kedah Darul Aman and held the office from June 16, 1996, until November 1999. He was elected Kuah District Assemblyman in 1995.

In honor of his contributions and services, he has been awarded medals and honors, among them DSSM, SSSA, DGSM, Kedah Crown Prince (SMK), Dato' Setia from the Sultan of Kedah (DSDK), the Chief Justice of the Crown (PSM) and the King's Hon. Must (SSDK).

Personal life
He is married to Puan Sri Nila Inangda Manyam Keumala and was blessed with 8 children. One of his prominent children is Akhramsyah Muammar Ubaidah bin Sanusi.

Death
Sanusi died on March 9, 2018, at his residence in Zehn Apartment, Bukit Pantai, Kuala Lumpur.

His body was taken to Saidina Umar Al-Khattab Mosque in Bukit Damansara at about 11 am for burial and prayer before being offered after Friday prayers. Two former prime ministers of Malaysia, Tun Dr Mahathir and Tun Abdullah Ahmad Badawi, also attended the prayer. His body reached Bukit Kiara Muslim Cemetery at approximately 2:30 pm before burial at 3 pm. The funeral was also attended by Deputy Minister of Defense, Datuk Seri Mohd Johari Baharum, Government Sociology Advisor Tan Sri Dr. Rais Yatim, BERSATU President Tan Sri Muhyiddin Yassin and Minister of Agriculture and Agro-based Industry, Datuk Seri Ahmad Shabery Cheek at the time of the funeral.

Election results

Honours

Honours of Malaysia
  :
  Commander of the Order of Loyalty to the Crown of Malaysia (PSM) – Tan Sri (1997)
  :
  Knight Companion of the Order of Loyalty to the Royal House of Kedah (DSDK) – Dato' (1982)
  Knight Grand Companion of the Order of Loyalty to the Royal House of Kedah (SSDK) – Dato' Seri (1997)
  :
  Grand Commander of the Exalted Order of Malacca (DGSM) – Datuk Seri (1984)
  :
  Knight Grand Companion of the Order of Sultan Salahuddin Abdul Aziz Shah (SSSA) – Dato' Seri (1990)
  :
  Grand Knight of the Order of the Crown of Pahang (SIMP) – formerly Dato', now Dato' Indera (2001)

References

External links
 Menteri Besar Kedah: Y.B. Tan Sri Sanusi Bin Junid by Corporation of Public Library, Kedah

1942 births
2018 deaths
People from Kedah
Malaysian people of Malay descent
Malaysian Muslims
Malaysian people of Acehnese descent
Government ministers of Malaysia
Chief Ministers of Kedah
Former United Malays National Organisation politicians
Malaysian United Indigenous Party politicians
Alumni of the University of London